The Houston Astros' 1992 season was a season in American baseball. It involved the Astros finishing fourth in the National League West with a record of 81 wins and 81 losses.

The Astros were forced to play 26 consecutive road games from July 27 through August 23, due to the Republican National Convention being held at the Astrodome from August 17–20. Houston went a respectable 12-14 on the trip, which saw the Astros play in all National League cities except Montreal, New York City, and Pittsburgh.

Following the road trip, the Astros won 25 of their final 38 games to finish at .500, an improvement of 16 games upon their franchise-worst 65-97 mark of 1991.

The Astros won six games on walk-off home runs, the most of any MLB team in 1992.

Offseason
 December 10, 1991: Kenny Lofton and Dave Rohde were traded by the Astros to the Cleveland Indians for Willie Blair and Eddie Taubensee.
 January 27, 1992: Joe Boever was signed as a free agent by the Astros.
 January 27, 1992: Ernest Riles was signed as a free agent by the Astros.
 January 27, 1992: Denny Walling was signed as a free agent by the Astros.

Regular season

Season standings

Record vs. opponents

Notable transactions
 April 2, 1992: Curt Schilling was traded by the Astros to the Philadelphia Phillies for Jason Grimsley.

Roster

Player stats

Batting

Starters by position
Note: Pos = Position; G = Games played; AB = At bats; H = Hits; Avg. = Batting average; HR = Home runs; RBI = Runs batted in

Other batters
Note: G = Games played; AB = At bats; H = Hits; Avg. = Batting average; HR = Home runs; RBI = Runs batted in

Pitching

Starting pitchers
Note: G = Games pitched; IP = Innings pitched; W = Wins; L = Losses; ERA = Earned run average; SO = Strikeouts

Other pitchers
Note: G = Games pitched; IP = Innings pitched; W = Wins; L = Losses; ERA = Earned run average; SO = Strikeouts

Relief pitchers
Note: G = Games pitched; W = Wins; L = Losses; SV = Saves; ERA = Earned run average; SO = Strikeouts

Farm system

References

External links
1992 Houston Astros season at Baseball Reference

Houston Astros seasons
Houston Astros season
Houston